"Forever Together" is a 1991 song by Randy Travis.

Forever Together may also refer to:

 Forever Together (film) or Can't Be Heaven, a 1999 American film
 Forever Together (American horse) (foaled 2004), a Thoroughbred racehorse
 Forever Together (Irish horse) (foaled 2015), a Thoroughbred racehorse

See also
 Together Forever (disambiguation)